"Written in the Stars" is a song by English rapper Tinie Tempah featuring American singer Eric Turner. Unlike his two prior breakthrough singles, which were produced by Labrinth, the track instead features production by iSHi. It was released digitally in September 2010 through Parlophone on the iTunes Store. It serves as the third official single from his debut album Disc-Overy. The song debuted at number one on the UK Singles Chart, becoming Tinie Tempah's second number-one single in the United Kingdom. The song was released as Tempah's debut U.S. single and peaked at No. 12 on the Billboard Hot 100. The track also marks Tinie's first top 10 hit on the Billboard Mainstream Top 40.

"Written in the Stars" was used by Major League Baseball for their commercials relating to the 2011 postseason. It was also chosen by WWE as its theme song for WrestleMania XXVII. Recently, it was used as the introduction to the eighth season of the South Asian Softball League. Since the 2011–12 season, it has been used as the theme song for Sky Sports' coverage of Premier League football. Samples of "Written in the Stars" can be heard in promos used for the USA Network sports-drama Necessary Roughness. The song was chosen as Miss USA 2011 Evening Gown Competition's background music. The New York Giants used the song as their entrance song in Super Bowl XLVI on 5 February 2012. It was also used in the closing ceremony of the London Olympic Games in August 2012. In May 2016, Tempah performed the song live at Wembley Stadium before the FA Cup final.

Background
"Written in the Stars" was written by "iSHi", Mughal, Tempah, Turner and Charlie Bernardo and produced by iSHi and James Perolls. Tinie Tempah first revealed the song on 17 June 2010 performing it live on Sony Ericsson's Pocket TV along with "Frisky". Tempah said "Written in the Stars it is a real passionate track about the sort of struggle that I've had to face. You know I just really feel it as something to perform at festivals as well so I thought I might as well get my practice and start warming up now."
The song was released on 27 September 2010, followed by Disc-Overy on 4 October 2010. ¨Written in The Stars¨ is written in the key of A minor

Critical reception
Robert Copsey of Digital Spy gave the song a very positive review:  Tempah makes abundantly clear on single number three that success wasn't handed to him on a platinum dinnerware set marked 'Doulton'. Au contraire, it was an exhausting journey of "believing and praying" in a dream that, for a time, "wasn't going nowhere" – and with his ear-snagging rhymes cloaked in a stadium-sized chorus courtesy of US newbie Eric Turner, we're all going to hear about it whether we want to or not. Oh Tinie, we'll never doubt your work hard, play hard mentality again. .

Music video

The official music video was directed by Alex Herron and was released on YouTube by Parlophone on 13 August 2010, along with a 43-second trailer of the video three days before. The video, shot in New York City, features Tinie Tempah standing and rapping on the roof while Eric Turner is sitting on the piano in a white room playing the chorus. The narrative scenes see a young boy whose life is shaped by the fact he and his mother are subjected to a financially insecure life and he is regularly bullied by his peers. After an interview with Virgin Media, the rapper claimed the boy 'not to be his younger self in the tennis courts' – he was trying to portray the life of a city boy. It made its US debut on 1 February 2011.

Chart performance
On 13 September 2010, "Written in the Stars" debuted on the New Zealand Singles Chart at number 22, beating "Pass Out", which peaked at number 33 on the chart in March 2010. It later peaked at number 16. The single also managed to chart in Switzerland, where it debuted at number 71 on 26 September 2010, Tempah's first single to make an impact in the country. On 3 October 2010, the track charted at No. 1 in the UK Singles Chart and UK R&B Chart, beating "Just the Way You Are" by Bruno Mars and "Let the Sun Shine" by Labrinth, making "Written in the Stars" Tinie Tempah's second number 1 in the UK after "Pass Out". "Written in the Stars" sold over 115,000 copies in its first week alone, which at that point of the year was a first week figure surpassed only by "California Gurls" by Katy Perry featuring Snoop Dogg (124,000) and the charity single "Everybody Hurts" by Helping Haiti (over 450,000). In the European Hot 100, the song debuted at number 5, the highest debut of the week. In January 2011, the single reached a peak position of number 34 and was certified Platinum in Australia. The song became Tinie Tempah's first song to chart on the Billboard Hot 100, debuting at number 91 for the week ending 5 March 2011 and peaking at number 12.

Track listings
 Digital download
 "Written in the Stars"  – 3:40
 Digital EP
 "Written in the Stars"  – 3:39
 "Written in the Stars"  – 3:39
 "Written in the Stars"  – 3:33
 Promotional CD single
 "Written in the Stars"  – 3:33
 "Written in the Stars"  – 3:40
 "Written in the Stars"  – 3:39
 "Written in the Stars"  – 3:40
 2011 BRIT Awards Performance
 "Written in the Stars"  / "Miami 2 Ibiza" / "Pass Out"  – 4:43

Charts and certifications

Weekly charts

Year-end charts

Certifications

In popular culture

Parody version
In 2012, a parody of the video was made by the cast and crew of ITV soap opera Emmerdale in honour of the departure of character Aaron Livesy, played by Danny Miller, who is a big fan of the song. The role of Tinie Tempah was played by Adam Thomas, who plays Adam Barton (Aaron's best friend in the soap), and the role of Eric Turner was played by Kelvin Fletcher, who plays Andy Sugden. The video features many well-known Emmerdale actors such as Emma Atkins, Jeff Hordley, Lucy Pargeter, Sammy Winward, Nicola Wheeler, Charley Webb, Natalie Anderson, Sian Reese-Williams and veteran actor Freddie Jones.

In 2022, a parody of the YouTube video was made by 442oons which the start of the 2022-23 Premier League season which was nostalgic when the song was heard as theme song for Sky Sports' coverage of Premier League football from 2011-12 until 2014-15.

Sports
TBS used this song in their commercials for the 2011 American League Division Series and the 2011 National League Division Series. The New York Giants used this song for their entrance for Super Bowl XLVI.

Covers
The Mend performed a mashup of "(I Just) Died in Your Arms" and "Written in the Stars" for their semi-final performance on Britain's Got Talent in 2012.

Karmin recorded a cover of "Written in the Stars" on their YouTube channel.

Release history

See also
 List of number-one singles of 2010 (Ireland)
 List of number-one singles from the 2010s (UK)
 List of number-one R&B hits of 2010 (UK)

References

2010 singles
Tinie Tempah songs
Irish Singles Chart number-one singles
Number-one singles in Scotland
UK Singles Chart number-one singles
Songs written by Eshraque "iSHi" Mughal
Songs written by Tinie Tempah
2010 songs
Parlophone singles
Songs written by Eric Turner (singer)
Rap rock songs